List of discontinued Volkswagen Group diesel engines.  The compression-ignition diesel engines listed below were formerly used by various marques of automobiles and commercial vehicles of the German automotive concern, Volkswagen Group, and also in Volkswagen Marine and Volkswagen Industrial Motor applications, but are now discontinued.  All listed engines operate on the four-stroke cycle, and unless stated otherwise, use a wet sump lubrication system, and are water-cooled.

Since the Volkswagen Group is European, official internal combustion engine performance ratings are published using the International System of Units (commonly abbreviated "SI"), a modern form of the metric system of figures.  Motor vehicle engines will have been tested by a Deutsches Institut für Normung (DIN) accredited testing facility, to either the original 80/1269/EEC, or the later 1999/99/EC standards.  The standard initial measuring unit for establishing the rated power output is the kilowatt (kW); and in their official literature, the power rating may be published in either the kW, or the 'Pferdestärke' (PS, which is sometimes incorrectly referred to as 'metric horsepower'), or both, and may also include conversions to imperial units such as the horsepower (hp) or brake horsepower (bhp).  (Conversions: one PS ≈ 735.5 watts (W), ≈ 0.98632 hp (SAE)).  In case of conflict, the metric power figure of kilowatts (kW) will be stated as the primary figure of reference.  For the turning force generated by the engine, the Newton metre (Nm) will be the reference figure of torque.  Furthermore, in accordance with European automotive traditions, engines shall be listed in the following ascending order of preference:
Number of cylinders,
Engine displacement (in litres),
Engine configuration, and
Rated power output (in kilowatts).

The diesel engines which Volkswagen Group currently manufactured and installed in today's vehicles, and Marine and Industrial applications, can be found in the list of Volkswagen Group diesel engines article.

Three-cylinder diesels

1.2 R3 PD TDI 3L
This inline three-cylinder Turbocharged direct injection (TDI) diesel engine is the powerplant of the Volkswagen Lupo 3L and Audi A2 3L, with a low fuel consumption of only  – hence the "3L" tag. It is based on the 1.4 TDI version, but the cylinder block is made of aluminium alloy, and some of the other components are lighter.
identification class: EA188, parts code prefix: ???, ID codes: ANY, AYZ
cylinder block & crankcase cast aluminium alloy (saving ); simplex-chain-driven balance shaft and oil pump, four main bearings
piston and piston rods Alcan aluminium pistons, trapezoid bearings shared with rods
cylinder head & valvetrain cast aluminium alloy; two valves per cylinder, 6 valves in total, each with two concentric valve springs, belt-driven single overhead camshaft (SOHC)
aspiration Garrett GT1541V turbocharger [Family 15,  compressor wheel (exducer diameter), VNT (Variable-Nozzle Turbine)], side-mounted intercooler (upright),water cooled exhaust gas recirculation (EGR) system integrated in heating cooling circuit (not in 1.4 TDI)
engine management Bosch EDC 15P (variant spelling: EDC 15+) electronic engine control unit (ECU) (some few old ones EDC 15 only)
exhaust system lightweight construction: reduced wall thickness and steel sheet exhaust manifold (instead of cast-iron),one near-engine-mounted catalytic pre-converter, one main catalytic converter and an end muffler(instead of one underfloor catalytic converter, one underfloor muffler and an end muffler attached to 1.4 TDI)
starter strengthened Bosch starter motor (12V, 150A, 1800W with 9 tooth pinion) for stop-start system with quick-start-function and voltage stabiliser for airbag-system, radio and instrument cluster
dimensions 
DIN-rated power & torque output SPORT mode: at 4,000 rpm;  at 1,800–2,400 rpm, 80% available from 1,300 rpm ECO mode: at 3,000 rpm;  at 1,600–2,400 rpm, "redline" is 3,000 rpm (instead of 4,800 rpm)
idling speed reduced while the car freewheels (above ) to 770 rpm (otherwise 850 rpm)
mean effective pressure  (in SPORT mode)
mean efficiency in driving cycle slightly over 30%
applications Audi A2 3L (ANY:- A2: 03/01-08/05), Volkswagen Lupo 3L  (ANY: 06/99-11/00, AYZ: 11/00-07/05)
references

awards

was winner of two categories in the 1999 annual competition for International Engine of the Year – "Best Fuel Economy" and "1-litre to 1.4-litre"

Four-cylinder EA111 diesels

The EA111 series of internal combustion engines was introduced in the mid 1970s in the Audi 50, and shortly after in the original Volkswagen Polo.  It is a series of water-cooled inline three- and inline four-cylinder petrol and diesel engines, in a variety of displacement sizes. This overhead camshaft engine features a crossflow cylinder head design, and directly driven auxiliary units. The exhaust side is in driving direction, closest to the front of the vehicle.

1.3 R4 D 33kW
identification parts code prefix: 031, ID codes: MN
engine configuration & engine displacement inline four-cylinder (R4/I4) diesel engine; ; bore/stroke 75 / 72 mm, 318.0 cc per cylinder, compression ratio: 22.0:1
cylinder block & crankcase gray cast iron; five main bearings
cylinder head & valvetrain cast aluminium alloy; two valves per cylinder, mechanical valve-play compensation, single overhead camshaft (SOHC)
fuel system Bosch VerteilerPumpe VP25 mechanical distributor injection pump, indirect fuel injection into whirl pre-combustion chamber
DIN-rated power & torque outputs
  at 4,900 rpm;  at 2,800 rpm
application Volkswagen Polo 1985-08 to 1990–07

1.4 R4 D 35kW
identification parts code prefix: 031, ID codes: 1W
engine configuration & engine displacement inline four-cylinder (R4/I4) diesel engine; ; bore/stroke 75 / 79.1 mm, 347.75 cc per cylinder, compression ratio: 22.3:1
cylinder block & crankcase gray cast iron; five main bearings
cylinder head & valvetrain cast aluminium alloy; two valves per cylinder, mechanical valve-play compensation, single overhead camshaft (SOHC)
fuel system Bosch VerteilerPumpe VP25 mechanical distributor injection pump, indirect fuel injection into whirl pre-combustion chamber
DIN-rated power & torque outputs
  at 4,500 rpm;  at 2,700–3,500 rpm
application Volkswagen Polo Mk2 1990-10 to 1994–07
NB. Not all technical details given in document showing the main characteristics of the 1391cc engine; they are assumed to be similar as it otherwise appears to be a longer-stroke version of the 1272cc.

Four-cylinder EA827 diesels

1.5 R4 D 33-37kW
identification parts code prefix: 068
engine configuration & engine displacement inline-four engine (R4/I4); ; bore x stroke: , stroke ratio: 0.96:1 – undersquare/long-stroke, 367.7 cc per cylinder, compression ratio: 23.5:1
cylinder block & crankcase gray cast iron; five main bearings
cylinder head & valvetrain two valves per cylinder, each with two concentric valve springs, 8 valves total, shim-adjustable bucket tappets, timing belt-driven single overhead camshaft (SOHC)
aspiration cast aluminium alloy intake manifold, cast iron exhaust manifold
fuel system timing belt-driven Bosch mechanical distributor injection pump, indirect fuel injection into whirl chamber
EWG-rated power & torque output, application, ID code  — Volkswagen Industrial Motor (682: 12/77-01/82)
DIN-rated power & torque output, ID code  at 4,400 rpm;  at 2,800 rpm — CK
applications Volkswagen Golf Mk1 (08/76-7/80), Volkswagen Passat B1 (08/77-7/80)

1.6 R4 D 36-40kW
identification parts code prefix: 068
engine configuration & engine displacement inline-four engine (R4/I4); ; bore x stroke: , stroke ratio: 0.89:1 – undersquare/long-stroke, 397.1 cc per cylinder, compression ratio: 23.5:1
cylinder block & crankcase gray cast iron; five main bearings
cylinder head & valvetrain two valves per cylinder, each with two concentric valve springs, 8 valves total, shim-adjustable bucket tappets, timing belt-driven single overhead camshaft (SOHC)
aspiration cast aluminium alloy intake manifold, cast iron exhaust manifold
fuel system timing belt-driven Bosch mechanical distributor injection pump, indirect fuel injection into whirl chamber
EWG-rated power & torque output, application, ID codes
  — Volkswagen Industrial Motor (685: 12/81-10/88, 68D: 03/89-03/94)
  — Volkswagen Industrial Motor (ADK: 04/94-07/96)
DIN-rated power & torque outputs, ID codes
  at 4,200 rpm;  at 2,500 rpm — CS
  at 4,800 rpm;  at 2,300 rpm — CR
  at 4,800 rpm;  at 2,000 rpm — JK
  at 4,580 rpm;  at 2,300 rpm — JP
applications Audi 80 (CR: 8/80-7/82, JK: 8/82-7/89), Volkswagen Polo (JK), Volkswagen Golf (CR: 8/80-7/82, JP: 8/83-10/91), Volkswagen Jetta (CR: 8/80-7/82, JP: 12/83-10/91), Volkswagen Passat (CR: 8/80-7/82), Volkswagen Type 2 (CS: 01/81-07/87)

1.6 R4 D 40kW
identification parts code prefix: 068, ID code: ME
engine configuration & engine displacement inline-four engine (R4/I4); ; bore x stroke: , stroke ratio: 0.89:1 – undersquare/long-stroke, 397.1 cc per cylinder, compression ratio: 23.0:1
cylinder block & crankcase gray cast iron; five main bearings
cylinder head & valvetrain two valves per cylinder, each with two concentric valve springs, 8 valves total, hydraulic valve-clearance compensation, timing belt-driven single overhead camshaft (SOHC)
aspiration cast aluminium alloy intake manifold, cast iron exhaust manifold
fuel system timing belt-driven Bosch mechanical distributor injection pump, indirect fuel injection into whirl chamber, altitude corrector
DIN-rated power & torque output  at 4,800 rpm;  at 2,500 rpm
applications Volkswagen Golf (07/85-07/92), Volkswagen Jetta (07/85-07/91), Volkswagen Caddy (08/90-07/92)

1.6 R4 TD 44-51kW
identification parts code prefix: 068
engine configuration & engine displacement inline four-cylinder (R4/I4) turbodiesel; ; bore x stroke: , stroke ratio: 0.89:1 – undersquare/long-stroke, 391.1 cc per cylinder, compression ratio: 23.0:1
cylinder block & crankcase gray cast iron; five main bearings
cylinder head & valvetrain two valves per cylinder, each with two concentric valve springs, 8 valves total, shim-adjustable bucket tappets, timing belt-driven single overhead camshaft (SOHC)
aspiration Garrett or Kühnle, Kopp & Kausch (KKK) turbocharger, cast aluminium alloy intake manifold, cast iron exhaust manifold
fuel system timing belt-driven Bosch mechanical distributor injection pump, indirect fuel injection into whirl chamber
EWG-rated power & torque outputs, application and ID codes
  — Volkswagen Industrial Motor (68A: 04/83-08/88), (686: 03/89-12/90)
  — Volkswagen Industrial Motor (68C: 04/83-03/94)
DIN-rated power & torque outputs, ID codes
  at 4,500 rpm;  at 2,600 rpm — CY, JR
  at 4,500 rpm;  at 2,500 rpm — JX
applications Audi 80 (CY: 02/82-03/87), Volkswagen Golf (CY: 8/81-7/84, JR: 08/83-10/91), Volkswagen Jetta (CY: 8/81-7/84, JR: 12/83-10/91), Volkswagen Passat (CY: 8/81-4/88), Volkswagen Type 2 (JX: 8/84-7/91), Volkswagen Type 2 Syncro (JX: 8/85-7/92), Volkswagen Type 2 (T3) (JX)

1.6 R4 TD 51kW
identification parts code prefix: 068, ID code: MF
engine configuration & engine displacement inline four-cylinder (R4/I4) turbodiesel; ; bore x stroke: , stroke ratio: 0.89:1 – undersquare/long-stroke, 391.1 cc per cylinder, compression ratio: 23.0:1
cylinder block & crankcase gray cast iron; five main bearings
cylinder head & valvetrain two valves per cylinder, 8 valves total, hydraulic valve-clearance compensation, timing belt-driven single overhead camshaft (SOHC)
aspiration Garrett or Kühnle, Kopp & Kausch (KKK) turbocharger, cast aluminium alloy intake manifold, cast iron exhaust manifold
fuel system timing belt-driven Bosch mechanical distributor injection pump, indirect fuel injection into whirl chamber
DIN-rated power & torque output  at 4,500 rpm;  at 2,500 rpm
application Volkswagen Golf Mk2 5/88-10/91

1.6 R4 TD 59kW
identification parts code prefix: ???
engine configuration & engine displacement inline four-cylinder (R4/I4) turbodiesel; ; bore x stroke: , stroke ratio: 0.89:1 – undersquare/long-stroke, 391.1 cc per cylinder, compression ratio: 23.0:1
cylinder block & crankcase gray cast iron; five main bearings
cylinder head & valvetrain
RA: two valves per cylinder, 8 valves total, mechanical bucket tappets, timing belt-driven single overhead camshaft (SOHC)
SB: two valves per cylinder, 8 valves total, hydraulic valve-clearance compensation, timing belt-driven single overhead camshaft (SOHC)
aspiration Garrett turbocharger, intercooler, cast aluminium alloy intake manifold, cast iron exhaust manifold
fuel system timing belt-driven Bosch mechanical distributor injection pump, indirect fuel injection into whirl chamber
DIN-rated power & torque outputs, ID codes
  at 4,500 rpm;  at 2,500 rpm — RA
  at 4,500 rpm;  at 2,500 rpm — SB
applications Audi 80/90 (RA: 04/88-07/90, SB: 04/89-12/91), Volkswagen Golf (RA: 04/89-02/90, SB: 08/89-10/91), Volkswagen Jetta Mk2 (RA: 04/89-02/90, SB: 08/89-10/91), Volkswagen Passat B2 (RA: 08/88-07/89), Volkswagen Passat B3 (SB: 08/89-10/93)

1.7 R4 D 42kW
identification parts code prefix: 033, ID code: KY
engine configuration & engine displacement inline-four engine (R4/I4); ; bore x stroke: , stroke ratio: 0.92:1 – undersquare/long-stroke, 428.9 cc per cylinder, compression ratio: 23.0:1
cylinder block & crankcase gray cast iron; five main bearings
cylinder head & valvetrain two valves per cylinder, 8 valves total, hydraulic valve-clearance compensation, timing belt-driven single overhead camshaft (SOHC)
aspiration cast aluminium alloy intake manifold, cast iron exhaust manifold
fuel system timing belt-driven Bosch mechanical distributor injection pump, indirect fuel injection into whirl chamber
DIN-rated power & torque output  at 4,500 rpm;  at 2,800 rpm
application Volkswagen Type 2 10/86-5/92

1.7 R4 SDI 44kW
identification parts code prefix: 028, ID codes: AHB, AHG, AKU, AKW
engine configuration & engine displacement inline four-cylinder (R4/I4) Suction Direct Injection (SDI); ; bore x stroke: , stroke ratio: 0.92:1 – undersquare/long-stroke, 428.9 cc per cylinder, compression ratio: 19.5:1
cylinder block & crankcase gray cast iron; five main bearings
cylinder head & valvetrain cast aluminium alloy; two valves per cylinder, 8 valves total, timing belt-driven single overhead camshaft (SOHC)
aspiration cast aluminium alloy intake manifold, cast iron exhaust manifold
fuel system & engine management timing belt-driven Robert Bosch GmbH VP37 (VerteilerPumpe) distributor injection pump with direct injection (DI)
exhaust system catalytic converter, European EU3 emissions compliant
DIN-rated power & torque output  at 4,200 rpm;  at 2,200 rpm
applications Volkswagen Lupo, SEAT Arosa, Volkswagen Polo, Volkswagen Caddy Mk2

1.9 R4 D 44-50kW 
identification
 parts code prefix: 028
 engine configuration & engine displacement
 cylinder block & crankcase
 gray cast iron; five main bearings, die-forged steel crankshaft
 cylinder head & valvetrain
 cast aluminium alloy; two valves per cylinder, 8 valves total, timing belt-driven single overhead camshaft (SOHC)
 aspiration
 cast aluminium alloy intake manifold, cast iron exhaust manifold
 fuel system
 timing belt-driven Lucas AEF mechanical distributor injection pump, indirect fuel injection into whirl chamber
 EWG-rated power & torque output, ID codes, application
  — ARD: Volkswagen Industrial Motor (01/02->)
  — 28B, ADG: Volkswagen Industrial Motor (28B: 01/90-03/94, ADG: 04/94->)
 DIN-rated power & torque output, ID codes
  at 4,300 rpm;  at 2,500–3,200 rpm — 1Y, AEF
  at 4,400 rpm;  at 2,200–2,600 rpm — 1Y
 applications
 Audi 80 (1Y: 08/89-12/91), SEAT Ibiza Mk2 (1Y: 02/93-06/99), SEAT Cordoba (1Y: 09/93-06/99), SEAT Toledo (1Y: 05/91-03/99), SEAT Inca (1Y: 11/95-06/03), Škoda Felicia (AEF: 10/95-08/01), Volkswagen Golf, Volkswagen Passat B3 (1Y: 05/89-09/93), Volkswagen Polo 6N (1994–2001).

1.9 R4 TD 55kW
identification parts code prefix:??? ID code: AAZ, ADE, ABL
engine configuration & engine displacement inline four-cylinder (R4/I4) turbodiesel; ; bore x stroke: , stroke ratio: 0.83:1 – undersquare/long-stroke, 474.1 cc per cylinder, compression ratio: 22.0:1
cylinder block & crankcase gray cast iron; five main bearings
cylinder head & valvetrain cast aluminium alloy; two valves per cylinder, 8 valves total, timing belt-driven single overhead camshaft (SOHC)
aspiration Garrett turbocharger
fuel system timing belt-driven Bosch mechanical distributor injection pump, indirect fuel injection into whirl chamber
EWG-rated power & torque output, ID code, application  — ADE: Volkswagen Industrial Motor (04/94-01/02)
DIN-rated power & torque output, ID code  at 4,200 rpm;  at 2,000 rpm — AAZ
applications Audi 80 (09/91-07/95), Volkswagen Golf, Volkswagen Transporter (T4), Volkswagen Passat, SEAT Ibiza Mk2 (02/93-08/97), SEAT Córdoba (09/93-08/97), SEAT Toledo (05/91-04/97), Volkswagen Vento

Four-cylinder PERKINS and MWM diesels

The first engine was bought from Perkins while the latter was produced by MWM International Motores Brasil, and are the TCA 4.07 type

2.7 R4 D 48kW
identification parts code prefix: 061; ID code: CG
engine configuration & engine displacement inline four-cylinder (R4/I4) diesel (D); ; bore x stroke: , stroke ratio: 0.91:1 – undersquare/long-stroke, 675.4 cc per cylinder, compression ratio: 21.0:1
cylinder block & crankcase gray cast iron; five main bearings; die–forged steel crankshaft, gear-driven camshaft, cast aluminium alloy oil sump
cylinder head & valvetrain ????; overhead valve (OHV): two valves per cylinder each with two concentric valve springs, 8 valves total, solid cam followers with pushrods, rocker arms with manual tappet adjustment
fuel system camshaft-actuated mechanical fuel lift pump, gear-driven mechanical rotary injection pump with indirect fuel injection into pre-combustion chamber
DIN-rated power & torque output  at 3,600 rpm;  at 2,300 rpm
application Volkswagen LT (01/76-11/82)

2.8 R4 12v TDI 92-116kW
identification parts code prefix: 062; ID codes: AGK, ATA, AUH, BCQ
engine configuration & engine displacement inline four-cylinder (R4/I4) Turbocharged Direct Injection (TDI) turbodiesel; ; bore x stroke: , stroke ratio: 0.90:1 – undersquare/long-stroke, 699.7 cc per cylinder, compression ratio: 19.1:1
cylinder block & crankcase gray cast iron; five main bearings; die–forged steel crankshaft
cylinder head & valvetrain cast aluminium alloy; three valves per cylinder (two inlet, one exhaust), 12 valves total, finger cam followers, gear-driven single overhead camshaft (SOHC)
aspiration air mass meter, cast aluminium alloy inlet manifold, cast iron exhaust manifold, turbocharger, intercooler
fuel system Bosch VE mechanical rotary injection pump with direct injection (DI); AUH and BCQ only with Bosch Common-Rail;exhaust gas recirculation (BCQ only)
DIN-rated power & torque outputs
  — AGK (07/97-12/98)
  — ATA (01/99-01/02)
 — AUH (02/02-07/06), BCQ (05/02-07/06)
application Volkswagen LT

Five-cylinder diesels

2.0 R5 D 51kW
identification parts code prefix: ???, ID code: CN
engine configuration & engine displacement inline five engine (R5/I5); ; bore x stroke , stroke ratio: 0.89:1 – undersquare/long-stroke, 397.1 cc per cylinder; compression ratio: 22.0:1
cylinder block & crankcase gray cast iron; six main bearings
cylinder head & valvetrain cast aluminium alloy; two valves per cylinder, single overhead camshaft (SOHC)
aspiration cast aluminium intake manifold, cast iron exhaust manifold
fuel system mechanical distributor injection pump, indirect fuel injection into whirl chamber
DIN-rated power & torque output  at 4,400 rpm;  at 2,800 rpm
application Audi 100 (10/78-7/89), Volvo 240

2.0 R5 TD 66kW
identification parts code prefix: ???, ID code: DE
engine configuration & engine displacement inline five engine (R5/I5) turbodiesel (TD); ; bore x stroke , stroke ratio: 0.89:1 – undersquare/long-stroke, 397.1 cc per cylinder, compression ratio: 23.0:1
cylinder block & crankcase gray cast iron; six main bearings
cylinder head & valvetrain cast aluminium alloy; two valves per cylinder, mechanical valve-lifters, single overhead camshaft (SOHC)
aspiration cast aluminium intake manifold, cast iron exhaust manifold, turbocharger
fuel system mechanical distributor injection pump, indirect fuel injection into whirl chamber
DIN-rated power & torque output  at ?,??? rpm
application Audi 100 (7/81-12/87)

2.0 R5 TD 75kW
identification parts code prefix: ???, ID codes: NC, 694
engine configuration & engine displacement inline five engine (R5/I5) turbodiesel (TD); ; bore x stroke , stroke ratio: 0.89:1 – undersquare/long-stroke, 397.1 cc per cylinder, compression ratio: 23.0:1
cylinder block & crankcase gray cast iron; six main bearings
cylinder head & valvetrain cast aluminium alloy; two valves per cylinder, hydraulic valve-play compensation, single overhead camshaft (SOHC)
aspiration cast aluminium intake manifold, cast iron exhaust manifold, turbocharger, intercooler
fuel system mechanical distributor injection pump, indirect fuel injection into whirl chamber
DIN-rated power & torque output  at ?,??? rpm
applications Audi 100 (NC: 03/88-12/90), Volkswagen Industrial Motor (694: 09/90-07/92)

2.4 R5 D 55-60kW
identification parts code prefix: 074, ID codes: 3D, AAB, AAS, ACP, AJA
engine configuration & engine displacement inline five engine (R5/I5); ; bore x stroke: , stroke ratio: 0.83:1 – undersquare/long-stroke, 474.1 cc per cylinder, compression ratio 22.0:1
cylinder block & crankcase gray cast iron; six main bearings
cylinder head & valvetrain cast aluminium alloy; two valves per cylinder each with two concentric valve springs, 10 valves total, solid bucket tappets, timing belt-driven single overhead camshaft (SOHC)
aspiration cast aluminium alloy intake manifold, cast iron exhaust manifold
fuel system timing belt-driven Bosch mechanical distributor injection pump with electrical fuel cut-off, indirect fuel injection into whirl chamber
EWG-rated power outputs, ID codes & applications
 at ?,??? rpm — 751: Volkswagen Industrial Motor (09/83-06/93)
 at ?,??? rpm — ACP: Volkswagen Industrial Motor (07/92-08/94)
DIN-rated power & torque outputs, ID codes
  at ?,??? rpm — AJA (04/97-06/03)
  at ?,??? rpm — AAB (09/90-09/98), ACP (07/92-08/94)
  at 4,200 rpm;  at 2,200 rpm — 3D, AAS
applications Audi 100 (3D: 08/89-12/90, AAS: 05/91-07/94), Volkswagen Transporter (T4)

2.5 R5 TDI 85-103kW
This engine was never offered in North America.
identification parts code prefix: 046
engine configuration & engine displacement inline five engine (R5/I5), Turbocharged Direct Injection (TDI) turbodiesel; ; bore x stroke: , stroke ratio: 0.85:1 – undersquare/long-stroke, 492.2 cc per cylinder, compression ratio: 20.5:1, viscous-coupled engine cooling fan
cylinder block & crankcase gray cast iron; six main bearings
cylinder heads & valvetrain cast aluminium alloy;  two valves per cylinder, 10 valves total, sliding finger cam followers, automatic hydraulic valve clearance compensation, timing belt-driven single overhead camshaft (SOHC)
aspiration vane type air mass meter, cast aluminium intake manifold, KKK K16 (early versions) or K14 (later versions) turbocharger, side-mounted intercooler (SMIC)
fuel system & engine management timing belt driven Bosch VE (ABP) or VP37 (AAT, AEL) mechanical distributor-type injection pump with direct injection (DI); Bosch EDC electronic ECU
exhaust system cast iron exhaust manifold, catalytic converter
DIN-rated power & torque outputs, ID codes
 at 4,000 rpm;  at 2,250 rpm — ABP (K16 turbocharger, no air mass meter, no EGR, no catalytic converter)
 at 4,000 rpm;  at 2,250 rpm — AAT (K16 turbocharger, up to 04/94)
 at 4,000 rpm;  at 1,900 rpm — AAT (K14 turbocharger, 05/94 onwards)
 at 4,000 rpm;  at 1,900 rpm — AEL (K14 turbocharger)
applications Audi 100 (AAT: 08/91-07/94, ABP: 06/91-07/92, Audi C4 A6 (AAT: 06/94-10/97, AEL/D5252T: 10/94-10/97), Volvo 850, Volvo V70 Ph1

reference

Six-cylinder diesels

2.4 R6 D24 51-60kW

identification parts code prefix: 075, 076
engine configuration & engine displacement inline six (R6/I6) diesel (D); ; bore x stroke: , stroke ratio: 0.89:1 – undersquare/long-stroke, 397.1 cc per cylinder, compression ratio: 22.0:1
cylinder block & crankcase gray cast iron; seven main bearings, die–forged steel crossplane crankshaft, pressed steel oil sump
cylinder head & valvetrain cast aluminium alloy; two valves per cylinder each with two concentric valve springs, timing belt-driven single overhead camshaft (SOHC) directly acting on shim-adjustable bucket tappet valve lifters
aspiration cast aluminium alloy intake manifold, two cast iron exhaust manifolds
fuel system Bosch mechanical distributor injection pump, indirect fuel injection into whirl pre-combustion chamber
EWG-rated power & torque output, application, ID codes  — Volkswagen Industrial Motor (761: 01/81-01/84, 751: 09/83-06/93)
DIN-rated power & torque outputs, ID codes
 — 1S, ACT
 at 4,000 rpm;  at 2,800 rpm — CP, DW
 at 4,700 rpm;  at 2,000 rpm — Volvo D24
applications Volkswagen LT (CP: 08/78-11/82, DW: 12/82-07/92, 1S: 08/88-07/92, ACT: 08/92-12/95), Volvo 240, Volvo 740
reference  and Volvo pocket data booklet TP 0302035 7000.05.96 English

2.4 R6 D24T 63-80kW

identification parts code prefix: 075
engine configuration & engine displacement inline six (R6/I6) turbodiesel (TD); ; bore x stroke: , stroke ratio: 0.89:1 – undersquare/long-stroke, 397.1 cc per cylinder, compression ratio: 22.0:1
cylinder block & crankcase gray cast iron; seven main bearings, die–forged steel crossplane crankshaft, pressed steel oil sump
cylinder head & valvetrain cast aluminium alloy; two valves per cylinder each with two concentric valve springs, timing belt-driven single overhead camshaft (SOHC) directly acting on shim-adjustable bucket tappet valve lifters
aspiration cast aluminium alloy intake manifold, cast iron exhaust manifold, turbocharger
fuel system Bosch mechanical distributor injection pump, indirect fuel injection into whirl pre-combustion chamber
EWG-rated power & torque output, application, ID code  — Volkswagen Industrial Motor (752: 09/83-06/93)
DIN-rated power & torque outputs, ID codes
 at 4,000 rpm;  at 2,500 rpm — ???
 — 1G
;  — DV
 at 4,800 rpm;  at 2,400 rpm — Volvo D24T (with EGR)
 at 4,800 rpm;  at 2,500 rpm — Volvo D24T (non EGR)
applications Volkswagen LT (DV: 12/82-07/92, 1G: 08/88-07/89), Volvo 740, Volvo 760, Volvo 940
reference  and Volvo pocket data booklet TP 0302035 7000.05.96 English

2.4 R6 D24TIC 70-90kW

identification parts code prefix: 075
engine configuration & engine displacement inline six (R6/I6) turbodiesel (TD); ; bore x stroke: , stroke ratio: 0.89:1 – undersquare/long-stroke, 397.1 cc per cylinder, compression ratio: 23.0:1
cylinder block & crankcase gray cast iron; seven main bearings, die–forged steel crossplane crankshaft, pressed steel oil sump
cylinder head & valvetrain cast aluminium alloy; two valves per cylinder each with two concentric valve springs, timing belt-driven single overhead camshaft (SOHC) directly acting on shim-adjustable bucket tappet valve lifters
aspiration cast aluminium alloy intake manifold, cast iron exhaust manifold, turbocharger, intercooler
fuel system Bosch mechanical distributor injection pump, indirect fuel injection into whirl pre-combustion chamber
DIN-rated power & torque outputs, ID codes
 at 4,000 rpm;  at 2,000 rpm — ACL
 at 4,000 rpm;  at 2,400 rpm — ???
 at 4,000 rpm;  at 2,400 rpm — ???
 at 4,600 rpm;  at 2,500 rpm — Volvo D24TIC (with EGR)
 at 4,800 rpm;  at 2,400 rpm — Volvo D24TIC (non EGR)
applications Volkswagen LT (ACL: 08/91-12/95), Volvo 740, Volvo 760, Volvo 940
reference  and Volvo pocket data booklet TP 0302035 7000.05.96 English

2.5 V6 24v TDI 110-132kW
This engine was never offered in North America.
identification parts code prefix: 059
engine configuration & engine displacement 90° V6 engine, Turbocharged Direct Injection (TDI) turbodiesel; ; bore x stroke: , stroke ratio: 0.91:1 – undersquare/long-stroke, 416.0 cc per cylinder, compression ratio: 19.5:1, viscous-coupled engine cooling fan
cylinder block & crankcase compacted vermicular graphite cast iron (GJV/CGI); four main bearings, die–forged steel crossplane crankshaft with split crankpins, light alloy pistons (Kolbenschmidt on 120 kW, Mahle or Kolbenschmidt on 132 kW), simplex roller chain-driven oil pump, two-part multi-baffled cast aluminium alloy oil sump, oil filter module (incorporating oil separator) mounted within the 'vee'
cylinder heads & valvetrain cast aluminium alloy; four valves per cylinder, 24 valves total, initially: sliding finger cam followers, later: low-friction roller finger cam followers, both with automatic hydraulic valve clearance compensation, dual timing belt relay-driven 2x double overhead camshaft (2xDOHC – two overhead camshafts per cylinder bank – 'quad cam', one timing belt driven from the crankshaft drives both inlet camshafts, the second belt relay-drives the exhaust camshafts from the inlet), dual inlet ports
aspiration hot-film air mass meter, one turbocharger mounted within the 'vee', two all-alloy side-mounted intercoolers (SMICs), two cast alloy intake manifolds
fuel system & engine management timing belt driven Bosch VE VP44 mechanical distributor-type injection pump with direct injection (DI); early variants with proprietary electronic engine control unit (ECU) and European EU3 emissions compliant; later variants with water-cooled exhaust gas recirculation (EGR), Bosch EDC15 electronic ECU and EU4
exhaust system cast iron exhaust manifolds, catalytic converter
DIN-rated power & torque outputs, ID codes
 at ?,??? rpm;  at 1,400 – 3,200 rpm — AFB, AKN
 at ?,??? rpm;  at 1,400 rpm — AYM
 at 4,000 rpm;  at 1,400 – 3,600 rpm — BCZ, BFC
 at 4,000 rpm;  at 1,500 – 3,000 rpm — BDG
 at 4,000 rpm;  at 1,500 – 2,500 rpm — AKE, BAU, BDH
applications 
Audi A4 (AFB: 11/97-06/00, AKN: 07/98-09/01, AYM: 12/00-06/02, AKE: 12/00-05/03, BFC: 07/02-05/03, BAU/BDH: 06/03-12/04, BCZ: 06/03-12/05, BDG: 06/03-05/06), 
Audi C5 A6 / Audi C5 allroad (AFB: 04/97-05/00, AKN: 10/98-05/01, AKE: 11/99-08/03, AYM: 06/01-06/02, BFC: 07/02-08/03, BDG/BDH: 02/03-01/05, BAU/BCZ: 02/03-08/05)
Audi D2 A8 (AFB: 06/97-06/00, AKN: 11/97-09/02, AKE: 11/99-09/02)
Škoda Superb B5 (AYM: 12/01-08/03, BDG: 08/03-03/08)
Volkswagen Passat (B5.5) (AFB: 08/98-08/00, AKN: 05/99-05/03, BAU/BDH: 01/03-05/05, BDG: 05/03-05/05)
reference

awards

The 2.5 V6 TDI was winner of the "2.0-litre to 2.5-litre" category in the 1999 annual competition for International Engine of the Year

Eight-cylinder diesels

3.3 V8 32v TDI CR 165kW
identification parts code prefix: 057.A; ID code: AKF
engine configuration & engine displacement 90° V8 engine, Turbocharged Direct Injection (TDI) turbodiesel; ; bore x stroke: , stroke ratio: 0.91:1 – undersquare/long-stroke, 416.0 cc per cylinder, compression ratio: 18.5:1, up to  cylinder pressure,
cylinder block & crankcase compacted vermicular graphite cast iron (GJV/CGI); two-part cast aluminium alloy oil sump, five  diameter main bearings, die–forged steel crossplane crankshaft with shared crankpins, diagonally split connecting rods, simplex roller chain-driven oil pump, pistons oil-cooled by cast-in cooling ducts
cylinder heads & valvetrain cast aluminium alloy; four valves per cylinder, 32 valves total, sliding-finger cam followers with automatic hydraulic valve clearance compensation, 2x hybrid-driven double overhead camshafts (2xDOHC – two overhead camshafts per cylinder bank – 'quad cam', inlet camshafts are driven from a front-sited timing belt from the crankshaft, exhaust camshafts are gear-driven at the rear from the inlet camshafts)
aspiration twin-turbo: two electronically controlled turbochargers with variable turbine geometry (VTG) (one turbo per cylinder bank),  maximum absolute pressure, combined 4-part inlet manifold and air-to-water intercooler mounted within the vee. With additional side-mounted coolant radiator and additional electric coolant pump
fuel system & engine management (Common rail system) Low-pressure fuel lift pump mounted underneath the car turns on only when starter is being operated (when cranking); after that an electromagnetic valve bypass the pump. It uses a gear-type lift pump mounted on the passenger-side cylinder head driven by the camshaft; it is used to supply the high-pressure pump with sufficient pressure. Bosch CP3 high-pressure pump is used driven by the timing belt. Max rail pressure is 1350bar. Watercooled return line fuel cooler with an additional cooling pump (runs all the time) and side-mounted radiator and air-cooled return line cooler mounted on the bottom of the car. six-hole solenoid injection nozzles, CR electronic injection control. Dual Bosch EDC15 engine management computers running in master/slave configuration.
exhaust system vacuum-operated water-cooled exhaust gas recirculation, two catalysts, European EU3 emissions standard compliant
dimensions length: , width: , height: 
DIN-rated power & torque output  at 4,000 rpm;  at 1,800–3,000 rpm
best specific consumption 205 g/kWh (41.1% energy efficiency)
application Audi D2 A8 quattro (12/99-09/02)
reference

4.0 (Technically – 3.9 L) V8 32v TDI CR 202kW
When introduced in May 2003, this 3.9-litre V8 was the highest power and highest torque diesel V8 fitted in any production car worldwide.  This was the second 'new' V engine from Audi which utilises new technologies – including chain-driven overhead camshafts and ancillary units, following the 4.2 40-valve V8 petrol engine first seen in the B6 S4.  This engine was discontinued in July 2005, superseded by the bored-out and updated but fundamentally identical 4.2 V8 TDI.
identification parts code prefix: 057.B, ID code: ASE
cylinder block & crankcase compacted vermicular graphite cast iron (GJV/CGI); cast reinforcing bed-plate lower frame incorporating five main bearings with each bearing affixed by four bolts, three-part oil sump consisting of cast alloy upper section, a middle baffle section and pressed steel lower section, die–forged steel crossplane crankshaft with shared crankpins, diagonally fracture-split connecting rods, chain-driven ancillaries, oil filter module (incorporating oil separator and water-to-oil cooler) mounted within the 'vee'
cylinder heads & valvetrain cast aluminium alloy; four valves per cylinder, 32 valves total, operated by low-friction roller finger cam followers with automatic hydraulic valve clearance compensation, 2x double overhead camshafts (2xDOHC – two overhead camshafts per cylinder bank – 'quad cam') – the inlets driven in a relay method at the rear (flywheel) end of the engine by four simplex roller chains and the exhausts driven from the inlets by automatic slack adjusting spur gears at the front end, two unequal-length swirl-inducing switchable inlet ports, siamesed unequal-length exhaust ports
fuel system & engine management electric low-pressure fuel lift pump, one toothed belt driven  injection pump, one central fuel distributor supplying two common rail (CR) fuel rails (one per cylinder bank), Bosch solenoid-valve injectors with seven-hole nozzles for homogenous fuel delivery, single and double pilot injection; Bosch EDC16 electronic engine control unit (ECU)
exhaust system twin water-cooled exhaust gas recirculation (mounted within the 'vee'), air-gap insulated fan-branch alloy steel exhaust manifolds, two close-coupled primary catalytic converters plus two main underfloor converters, Euro3 emissions standard
dimensions length: , mass: 
DIN-rated power & torque output ;  at 1,800–2,500 rpm
application Audi D3 A8 4.0 TDI quattro (05/03-07/05)
reference

Ten-cylinder diesels

4.9/5.0 V10 TDI PD 230-258kW
This '4.9' or '5.0' badged V10 TDI diesel engine is only used in Volkswagen Passenger Cars 'premium' models. At its launch in the Volkswagen Phaeton, it became the most powerful diesel-engined car in the world. A heavily modified dry sump version was used in an LMP1 Lola sports car to compete in the 2004 Le Mans under a Caterpillar badge. 
identification parts code prefix: 07Z
cylinder block & crankcase low-pressure die-cast aluminium alloy (AlSi8Cu3); bolted-on grey cast iron bearing tunnel and crank carrier with six main bearings, die-forged steel cross-plane crankshaft with 18-degree crankpin offset to achieve a 72-degree even firing order, contra-rotating balance shaft, diagonally cracked forged connecting rods, two-part cast aluminium alloy baffled oil sump
cylinder heads & valvetrain cast aluminium alloy; two valves per cylinder, 20 valves total, each with two concentric valve springs and bucket tappets, gear-driven single overhead camshaft utilising a separate cassette-type 'motor control module'
aspiration two air filters with two hot-film air mass meters, twin-turbo: two electrically controlled Garrett GT1852V variable vane turbochargers, two side-mounted intercoolers, two cast alloy intake manifolds
fuel system & engine management Pumpe Düse (PD) diesel direct injection: one underfloor electric fuel lift pump, two camshaft-driven low-pressure fuel pumps supplying common fuel rails (one per cylinder bank), ten camshaft-actuated UI-P1  Unit Injectors with solenoid-actuated nozzles, 72° injection interval; two Bosch EDC16 32-bit electronic engine control units (ECUs) working on the 'master/slave' method
exhaust system water-cooled exhaust gas recirculation (EGR), air-gap insulated cast iron exhaust manifolds, two close-coupled ceramic catalytic converters, two main underfloor oxidising catalytic converters, EU3 emissions compliant
dimensions length: 
4.9 DIN-rated power & torque output, ID codes
 at 3,750 rpm;  at 2,000 rpm — AJS, BLE, BKW (North America)
5.0 DIN-rated power & torque outputs, ID codes
 at 3,750 rpm;  at 2,000 rpm — AYH, BWF
 at 3,500 rpm;  at 2,000 rpm — CBWA: Touareg R50
4.9 applications Volkswagen Phaeton 4motion (AJS: 12/02-10/06), Volkswagen Touareg (BKW: 11/03-11/04, BLE: 11/04->)
5.0 application Volkswagen Touareg (AYH: 11/02-11/06, BWF: 12/06-02/09), Touareg R50 (CBWA: 08/07->)
references

awards

Was the winner of the "Above 4.0-litre" category for two consecutive years in the 2003 and 2004 annual competition for International Engine of the Year

See also

list of Volkswagen Group petrol engines (current)
list of Volkswagen Group diesel engines (current)
list of discontinued Volkswagen Group petrol engines
list of North American Volkswagen engines
Turbocharged Direct Injection (TDI)
Suction Diesel Injection (SDI)
G-Lader
G60 – for detailed development info and progression of forced induction in Volkswagen Group engines
BlueMotion
list of Volkswagen Group platforms
list of Volkswagen Group factories

References

External links
VolkswagenAG.com – Volkswagen Group corporate website
Chemnitz (Germany) – engine plant Mobility and Sustainability
Kassel (Germany) – engine plant Mobility and Sustainability
Salzgitter (Germany) – engine plant Mobility and Sustainability
Polkowice (Poland) – engine plant Mobility and Sustainability
São Carlos (Brazil) – engine plant Mobility and Sustainability
Shanghai (China) – engine plant Mobility and Sustainability
Audi at a glance – includes information on the Győr engine plant 
Audi-TDI-chronicle.com – official Audi history and timeline of the TDI engine

Diesel engines by model
History of the diesel engine
Marine diesel engines
Lists of automobile engines